The 2021–22 Men's Hoofdklasse Hockey, also known as the Tulp Hoofdklasse Men for sponsorship reasons, was the 49th season of the Men's Hoofdklasse Hockey, the top Dutch field hockey league. It began on 12 September 2021 and it concluded on 28 May 2022 with the second match of the championship final.

Bloemendaal were the defending champions. They defended their title by defeating Pinoké 3–0 in the final best of three series.

Teams

Accommodation and locations

Personnel

Number of teams by province

Regular season

Standings

Results

Top goalscorers

Play-offs
The semi-finals were held on 15, 21 and 22 May 2022 and the final was held on 26 and 28 May 2022.

Bracket

Semi-finals

Bloemendaal won series 2–1.

Pinoké won series 2–0.

Final

Bloemendaal won series 2–0.

Relegation play-offs
The relegation play-offs were held on 1, 4 and 6 June 2022.

Overview

|}

Matches

Voordaan won series 2–1 and were promoted to the Hoofdklasse while Tilburg were relegated to the Promotieklasse.

HDM won series 2–1 and were promoted to the Hoofdklasse while SCHC were relegated to the Promotieklasse.

References

Men's Hoofdklasse Hockey
Hoofdklasse
Hoofdklasse Hockey Men
Hoofdklasse Hockey Men